The Rome II Regulation (EC) No 864/2007 is a European Union Regulation regarding the conflict of laws on the law applicable to non-contractual obligations. From 11 January 2009, the Rome II Regulation created a harmonised set of rules within the European Union to govern choice of law in civil and commercial matters (subject to certain exclusions, such as the application being manifestly incompatible with the public policy of the forum) concerning non-contractual obligations. Additionally, in certain circumstances and subject to certain conditions, the parties may choose the law applicable to a non-contractual obligation. Analogous rules were established for contractual obligations by the Rome Convention of 1980. The Rome Convention has, in turn, been replaced by the Rome I Regulation on the law applicable to contractual obligations (Reg. (EC) No. 593/2008). The regulation applies to all EU member states except Denmark.

Background

Initially submitted by the Commission in July 2003, an amended text was finally adopted on 11 July 2007 and published in the Official Journal on 31 July 2007. It applies to events arising since 11 January 2009. It may apply to obligations arising from events giving rise to damage occurring from an earlier date, 20 August 2007, although the text of the Regulation is unfortunately silent on this point.

Contents
The regulation includes specific rules for tort/delict (harm caused by failure to perform a duty) and specific categories of tort/delict, unjust enrichment, negotiorum gestio (acting as an agent without permission) and culpa in contrahendo (misleading negotiation of a contract).

Application

To accommodate concerns earlier raised by the European Parliament at Second Reading stage in January 2007, the commission is mandated to draw up a study by December 2008 on applicable law in defamation and privacy disputes, which have been excluded from the Regulation as a result of the difficulties in agreeing appropriate choice of law rules for these matters. That study has not yet been formally published. This is in addition to their preparing a report within 4 years on the results of practical application of the Regulation, including a specific study of its effects in road traffic accident disputes.

United Kingdom
, following Brexit, the regulation is retained EU law within the UK, subject to minor amendments.

See also
Rome I Regulation (Applicable law in contractual obligations)
Rome III Regulation (Applicable law in divorce cases)
Tort (conflict)
Brussels Regime, governing jurisdiction

Notes

References

External links
  text adopted.
 European Commission tracking page on the proposal
 Text initially proposed by the European Commission (July 2003)
 Text of Common Position adopted by the Council of Ministers (September 2006)
 Amendments proposed by the European Parliament at Second Reading (January 2007)
 Press Release summarising the European Parliament amendments
 Article for the Lawyer magazine, 15 January 2007 by Diana Wallis MEP, rapporteur for the Regulation in the European Parliament.
 romeii.eu - Legislative materials and news on the Rome II Regulation

2007 in law
Conflict of laws
European Union regulations
2007 in the European Union
Law of obligations